John William Kiser (June 20, 1857 – October 31, 1916) was a 19th-century industrialist who owned the Monarch Cycle Manufacturing Company in Chicago, Illinois. His company became one of the largest bicycle manufacturers in the world.

Early life 
Kiser was born in St. Paris, Ohio, June 20, 1857. His parents were farmers George R. Kiser and Margaret Ellen (née McVey) Kiser.  In 1884 he graduated with a Bachelor of Arts degree from Wittenburg College.

Career 

In 1889 when Kiser moved to Chicago, he had few resources, with his obituary in the American Artisan and Hardware Record later describing him as "practically penniless".  That same year he took a job as manager of the Chicago Sewing Machine company. He rose to become the president of the company. Taking advantage of a boom in bicycle usage in the United States at that time, he and his partner Chandler Robbins then started Monarch Cycle Manufacturing Company to manufacture bicycles.

In 1892, Monarch Cycle had only 35 employees and  made 150 bicycles. By 1896 the company had 1200 employees, and they were producing 50,000 bicycles. The company sold bicycles worldwide.

In 1899 he sold his company to the Bicycle Trust.

In 1902 he became the treasurer of the Phoenix Horseshoe Company of Chicago. By 1907 he was made president of the company. He was also the director of the First National Bank and the Miehle Printing Press.

Personal life 
He married Thirza (in some places spelled Thyrza) Wilhelmina (née) Furrow on September 18, 1884. They had one son born June 10, 1889; he was also named John William Kiser.  It was reported that Kiser had amassed a fortune of $8 million (approximately $200 million USD, adjusted for inflation as of December 2021) by the time of his death.

Death 
Kiser spent his time in St. Paris, Ohio, and New York and Chicago. He died October 31, 1916, in Chicago Illinois, at the Blackstone Hotel and his body was sent back to St. Paris for burial.

Reference

External links 
John William Kiser at Find a Grave

1857 births
1916 deaths
19th-century American businesspeople
20th-century American businesspeople
Businesspeople from Ohio
Businesspeople from Chicago
People from Champaign County, Ohio
American industrialists